Playback is a South Korean girl group formed by Clear Company in 2015. They debuted on June 25, 2015, with the digital single "Playback". As of August 2021, Playback only has two members under the label: Yunji and Eunjin. According to the group's website however, Yunji, Yujin, Woolim and Eunjin are still members of the group.

History

Pre-debut 
Prior to joining Playback, Woolim spent three years as a trainee under JYP Entertainment. She later rose to fame after a video of her appearance on Mnet’s mystery singing show I Can See Your Voice, where she performed Ariana Grande’s “Problem,” went viral.

2015–2017: Debut, new member and new agency 
Playback released their eponymous debut single album Playback and its title track of the same name on June 25, 2015. Three months later, the group announced they planned to release a new single album on September 2. The album's title track, "I Wonder", featured singer and host Eric Nam. The song garnered attention from media due to the involvement of Norwegian production team ELEMENT, whose resume includes CeeLo Green, Musiq Soulchild, and Madcon.

Soon after their debut, their management label was merged with Coridel Entertainment in late-2015, and they were later officially managed by Coridel Entertainment.

Eunjin was added back to the group on April 13, 2017, after being cut from the group before their official debut.

On October 13, 2017 KST, Playback's agency Coridel Entertainment, released a statement through the group's official fan cafe to confirm that the members will be joining YG's survival show, Mix Nine. They said, "After a long period of inactivity and preparing for a comeback, the group was given an offer to appear on the show 'Mix Nine'. We decided to go on the show because we believe that it will be a good chance for each member to show their talents and abilities. The members of the group are preparing and working hard to show their best and are aiming to release an album mid-October so please stay tuned and continue to support the girls."

2019–present: Hayoung, Yujin, and Woolim’s Departures 
On November 5, 2019, FN Entertainment announced that Yujin had signed on with the agency as an actress under the name Oh Chae Yi.

On June 11, 2020, O& Entertainment announced that Hayoung had signed on with the agency after leaving Management Nangnam and will now be using the stage name Han Na Young.

On May 25, 2021, it was announced that Woolim signed with LeanBranding.

Members
 Lee Yun-ji
 Lee Ha-young
 So Yu-jin
 Hwang Woo-lim
 Ma Eun-jin

Discography

Single albums

Singles

Videography

Music videos

Endorsements

Awards and nominations

Seoul Music Awards

|-
|2015
| "Playback"
| New Artist Award
|

References

External links

  

K-pop music groups
South Korean girl groups
Musical groups from Seoul
South Korean dance music groups
Musical groups established in 2015
2015 establishments in South Korea
Musical quartets